Pak Gyong-sil (1 February 1975 – 16 July 2006) was a North Korean gymnast. She competed in six events at the 1992 Summer Olympics. She is known for introducing the Pak salto.

Eponymous skill
The Pak salto is named after Pak in the Code of Points.

References

External links
 
 https://www.youtube.com/watch?v=YsMj-2e-EDQ 1989 Worlds uneven bars performance in which she introduced the Pak salto

1975 births
2006 deaths
North Korean female artistic gymnasts
Olympic gymnasts of North Korea
Gymnasts at the 1992 Summer Olympics
Place of birth missing
Originators of elements in artistic gymnastics
20th-century North Korean women